Farrand may refer to:

 William R. Farrand (1853–1930), American manufacturer of pianos and organs
 Livingston Farrand (1867–1939), American physician and anthropologist
 Royal T. Farrand (1867–1927), American football player and medical doctor
 Max Farrand (1869–1945), American historian
 Beatrix Farrand (1872–1959), American landscape gardener and architect
 John Farrand (born 1945), British-American business executive
 Phil Farrand (born 1958), American computer programmer

See also 
 Farrands